Taishitun Town is a town located in the Miyun District of Beijing, China. Chao River, Qingshui River and Andamu River converge here before flowing into Miyun Reservoir. The town is situated on the south of Gaoling and Gubeikou Towns, west of Xinchengzi and Wulingshan Towns, northwest of Beizhuang and Dachengzi Towns, as well as northeast of Jugezhuang and Mujiayu Towns. According to the 2020 census, it was home to 22,388 inhabitants.

Prior to the Ming dynasty, this region had been the residence of the Court Astronomer, thus earned the name Taishitun. Later the name evolved into its current form.

History

Administrative divisions 
As of the time in writing, Taishitun Town is divided into 39 subdivisions, in which 5 are communities and 34 are villages. They are organized into the following list:

Transportation 
China National Highway 101 and Daqing–Guangzhou Expressway run through the town.

Gallery

See also 
 List of township-level divisions of Beijing

References

Miyun District
Towns in Beijing